Michael Bakos (born March 2, 1979 in Augsburg, West Germany) is a German professional ice hockey defenceman for the Augsburger Panther of the Deutsche Eishockey Liga.

Playing career
Bakos began playing professionally in 1996 with the Augsburger Panthers, with whom he played for four seasons until 2000. Beginning with the 2000–01 season, he played with Mannheim Eagles for six years. He joined ERC Ingolstadt in 2006.

During his fourth season with Ingolstadt, on January 2, 2010, it was announced that Bakos signed a two-year-contract with the Straubing Tigers to start in the 2010–11 season.

Bakos returned to the Augsburger Panthers to begin the 2012–13 season.

Bakos was selected to play for the German national team for the 2010 Winter Olympics.

Career statistics

Regular season and playoffs

International

References

External links
 
 

1979 births
Adler Mannheim players
Augsburger Panther players
ERC Ingolstadt players
German ice hockey defencemen
Ice hockey players at the 2010 Winter Olympics
Living people
Olympic ice hockey players of Germany
Sportspeople from Augsburg
Straubing Tigers players